Sclerotinia gemycircularvirus 1 is a single stranded DNA virus with a circular genome that infects the fungus Sclerotinia sclerotiorum. Infection with this virus decreases the virulence of this fungus. The mechanism of this effect is not known.

Virology

The virions are isometric particles, 20–22 nanometers in diameter. The capsid is composed on the viral coat protein (VCP).

Genome

The genome encodes only two proteins—a replicase and the coat protein. The genes are encoded on complementary strands.

Taxonomy

This virus appears to be related to but distinct from members of the Geminiviridae. Unlike geminiviruses, this virus does not have a movement protein. It has been officially classified into the genus Gemycircularvirus within the new family Genomoviridae.

References

Single-stranded DNA viruses